At the 1992 Summer Olympics, eight fencing events were contested. Men competed in both individual and team events for each of the three weapon types (épée, foil and sabre), but women competed only in foil events.

Medal summary

Men's events

Women's events

Medal table
Germany and Italy finished joint-top of the fencing medal table at the 1992 Summer Olympics.

Participating nations
A total of 305 fencers (234 men and 71 women) from 42 nations competed at the Barcelona Games:

References

External links
Official Olympic Report

 
1992
1992 Summer Olympics events
1992 in fencing
International fencing competitions hosted by Spain